Shahrak-e Tang-e Hana (also Romanized as Shahrak-e Tang-e Ḩanā; also known as Tang-e Ḩanā and Tang Ḩanā) is a village in Hana Rural District, Abadeh Tashk District, Neyriz County, Fars Province, Iran. At the 2006 census, its population was 494, in 112 families.

References 

Populated places in Abadeh Tashk County